Grace Van Dien (born ) is an American actress and Twitch streamer. She is known for playing Brooke Osmond in the Netflix teen drama series Greenhouse Academy (2017) and Katie Campbell in NBC drama series  The Village (2019). She also portrayed Sharon Tate in the Mary Harron-directed film Charlie Says (2018).

Early life
Van Dien was born and raised in Los Angeles, California. She is the daughter of actors Casper Van Dien and Carrie Mitchum, and the great-granddaughter of Hollywood Golden Age star Robert Mitchum. Her former stepmother is actress Catherine Oxenberg. Van Dien has one older brother, and two half-sisters. On her father's side, Van Dien has Dutch, Swedish, French, and English ancestry.

Career 
In 2005, Van Dien appeared with her family in the reality series, I Married a Princess, which aired on the Lifetime Television channel in the United States. Van Dien played several small roles in her father's films throughout her childhood. Prior to formally beginning her acting career, Van Dien intended to become a writer, before discovering a passion for acting while filming Sleeping Beauty (2014). Between 2015 and 2017, she appeared in several television films, independent films and had guest starring roles in the television series Code Black and White Famous.

Van Dien's first major television role was as Brooke Osmond in the Netflix teen drama series Greenhouse Academy, a role she played in the series' first two seasons (2017–2019). In 2018, she starred as Sharon Tate in the biographical film Charlie Says, which had its world premiere at the 75th Venice International Film Festival. In 2019, Van Dien was cast in the starring role of Katie Campbell in the NBC drama series  The Village, which was cancelled after one season.

In 2022, Van Dien guest starred in the fourth season of the Netflix series Stranger Things, playing Chrissy Cunningham, a popular but troubled cheerleader at Hawkins High School. The same year, Van Dien began streaming on video game live streaming service Twitch, reaching over 200,000 followers within three months of starting her channel. She signed with United Talent Agency for representation in August 2022. In March 2023, Van Dien stated during a Twitch livestream that she would be focusing more of her time on streaming over acting after being sexually propositioned during a movie shoot.

Filmography

Film

Television

Music video
 "Cool People in LA" (2019), by Bret James

References

External links 
 

1996 births
Living people
American film actresses
American television actresses
21st-century American actresses
Mitchum_family

Twitch (service) streamers
American people of Swedish descent
American people of Dutch descent
American people of French descent
American people of English descent